Criz Russu Napoles Laurente (born October 13, 2001) is a Filipino television personality and former athlete who represented the Philippines to AIBA Youth World Boxing Championships, Asian Junior Boxing Championships, Children of Asia International Games, Asian Youth Boxing Championships, and Palarong Pambansa. Laurente was a teen housemate of Connect, the ninth season of Pinoy Big Brother, where he was dubbed as "Ang Bunsong Boksingero ng General Santos".

He was cited as best junior boxer in Asia of 2016 by Asian Boxing Confederation. He was also cited during 2017 PSA Annual Awards and 2019 PSA Annual Awards handed out by Philippine Sportswriters Association. He was awarded as Young Hero during 1st Siklab Sports Youth Awards by the Philippine Olympic Committee.

Filmography

Film

Television/Digital

References

External links
ASBC NewsBangkok PostSports UZBalitaInstagramManila TimesPhilippine News AgencyBox NationDepartment of Foreign Affairs

Living people
2001 births
Filipino male boxers
Pinoy Big Brother contestants
21st-century Filipino people